Artyom Vasilyevich Mastrov (born 12 November 1976) is a Russian middle-distance runner. He competed in the men's 800 metres at the 2000 Summer Olympics.

References

1976 births
Living people
Athletes (track and field) at the 2000 Summer Olympics
Russian male middle-distance runners
Olympic athletes of Russia
Sportspeople from Kazan